Hyloxalus maquipucuna is a species of frog in the family Dendrobatidae. It is endemic to Ecuador where it is only known from its type locality in the Maquipucuna reserve, in the Pichincha Province. Its name is a reference to this reserve.

Description
Males measure  and females  in snout–vent length (based on 1 male and 2 females, the type series). It has moderately robust body. It is black dorsally and laterally, with a bright yellow dorsolateral stripe that extend to eye. Legs are orange and venter is yellow. Skin of dorsum is smooth (except slightly pustular in pelvic region).

Habitat and conservation
Its natural habitats are cloud forests at elevations of about  asl. It lives near streams.

Hyloxalus maquipucuna has not been observed after it was collected for the first time in 1990. This may be due to insufficient survey effort. As the type locality is within a reverse, forest clearance is not a threat.

References

maquipucuna
Amphibians of Ecuador
Endemic fauna of Colombia
Amphibians described in 1995
Taxonomy articles created by Polbot